The 1997 Mercedes Cup was a men's tennis tournament played on outdoor clay courts at the Tennis Club Weissenhof in Stuttgart, Germany, that was part of the Championship Series of the 1997 ATP Tour. It was the 49th edition of the tournament and was held from 14 July until 20 July. Third-seeded Àlex Corretja won the singles title.

Finals

Singles
 Àlex Corretja defeated  Karol Kučera, 6–2, 7–5

Doubles
 Gustavo Kuerten /  Fernando Meligeni defeated  Donald Johnson /  Francisco Montana, 6–4, 6–4

References

External links
 Official website 
 ITF tournament edition details
 ATP tournament profile

Mercedes Cup
Stuttgart Open
1997 in German tennis